Ilir Luarasi (12 March 1954 – 17 January 2018) was an Albanian retired football player. He was a goalkeeper for Dinamo Tiranë and the Albania national team in the 70s and 80s.

Club career
Luarasi spent 11 years between the posts of Dinamo, playing alongside fellow internationals Muhedin Targaj and Ilir Përnaska among others. He won three league titles and two domestic cups with the club and played in the 1985–86 UEFA Cup.

He was found dead in his house in France in January 2018.

International career
He made his debut for Albania in a November 1981 FIFA World Cup qualification match away against West Germany and earned a total of 2 caps, scoring no goals. His second and final international was a September 1982 European Championship qualification match against Austria.

Honours
Albanian Superliga: 3
 1977, 1980, 1986

References

External links

1954 births
2018 deaths
Footballers from Tirana
Albanian footballers
Association football goalkeepers
Albania international footballers
FK Dinamo Tirana players
Kategoria Superiore players
Albanian football managers
KS Kastrioti managers